South Calgary was a provincial electoral district in Calgary, Alberta, Canada, mandated to return a single member to the Legislative Assembly of Alberta using the first past the post method of voting from 1913 to 1921.

History

Boundary history

Electoral history
The South Calgary electoral district was created in 1913 when the Calgary provincial electoral district was carved into three ridings. The first election in 1913 featured a two candidate fight between Dr. Thomas Blow Conservative candidate and well known Calgary area lawyer Clifford Jones.

Blow won the district with 71% of the popular vote, riding the peak of a wave that saw all the Calgary districts return Conservatives that year.

The second and final election in the district in 1917 saw Blow re-elected. Blow defeated Labor Representation leader William Irvine and sitting City of Calgary Alderman John McNeill to hold his district. The South Calgary district was abolished in 1921 as Calgary was reconstituted into a five-member district.

Election results

1913 general election

1917 general election

See also
List of Alberta provincial electoral districts

References

Further reading

External links
Elections Alberta
The Legislative Assembly of Alberta

Politics of Calgary
Former provincial electoral districts of Alberta